The .40-65 Winchester (also called the .40-65 Winchester and Marlin) was an American rifle cartridge.

Introduced in 1887 for the Winchester Model 1886, and available in Winchester single shots and in the Marlin Model 1895, it was "a further effort to put more steam" in repeating rifle cartridges. In the modern era, the cartridge has gained favor for metallic silhouette shooting and Black Powder Cartridge Rifle matches where it serves as a low-recoil alternative to the common 45–70.

It was commercially available in black and smokeless varieties until around 1935, and can be handloaded by reforming .45-70 brass.

NOTE: The specifications list the shoulder diameter as 0.0560", the base diameter as 0.0504" and the rim diameter as 0.604", this is not physically possible. Unfortunately I do not know the true dimensions.

Nomenclature
The nomenclature of the period was based on several properties of the cartridge:

 .40: nominal caliber in inches: 0.40 inches (10.2 mm); actual caliber was .406 in ( mm)
 65 : weight of propellant (black powder) charge, in grains: 65 grains (4.2 g)

See also
List of cartridges by caliber
List of rifle cartridges
Marlin Model 1895
10 mm caliber

References

Pistol and rifle cartridges
Winchester Repeating Arms Company cartridges